The Península de Setúbal (English: Setúbal Peninsula) is a former NUTS III subdivision of Portuguese region of Lisbon (NUTS II). It was abolished at the January 2015 NUTS 3 revision. Comprising several municipalities and urban centres, the subregion's capital is Setúbal, and includes several cities including Almada and Setúbal.

History
The region of Setúbal was a pioneer in the development of a regional strategic plan to assist the growth of the economic, social and cultural institutions. The Plano Integrado para o Desenvolvimento para o Distrito de Setúbal (PIDDS) which was elaborated in the 1980s by the Associação de Municípios do Distrito de Setúbal (Association of Municipalities of the District of Setúbal), constituted the first development plan for the district, and envisioned a series of measures that were essential for the ambitious plans of its inhabitants.
 
In 2000, under the initiatives of the Association of Municipalities (today AMRS), established a formal Strategic Plan for Development (Plano Estratégico para o Desenvolvimento da Península de Setúbal), or PEDEPES, with the slogan Mais Desenvolvimento, melhor Futuro (More development, better future). A formal presentation occurred in December 2004, resulting from diagonistic phases and objectives, that presented 132 concrete measures based on the Strategic Plan. The development of the PEDEPES involved the participation and consensus of 239 entities in and the Strategic plan continues to be a fundamental instrument in the regional intervention process.

Municipalities
The subregion of the Peninsula of Setúbal comprises nine municipalities extending from the southern margin and mouth of the Tagus into the interior, and southern coast. They include:

 Alcochete
 Almada
 Barreiro
 Moita
 Montijo
 Palmela
 Seixal
 Sesimbra
 Setúbal

Urban centres
Although the cities of Portugal have no political stature, for social and economic purposes they form as distinct centres of urban activity. The region of the Peninsula of Setúbal include several large centres, including Almada, Setúbal, Amora, Barreiro, Seixal, Montijo and Costa da Caparica, in addition to the larger towns of Sesimbra, Moita, Palmela, Alcochete, Corroios, Pinhal Novo, Monte da Caparica, Charneca da Caparica, Trafaria, Lavradio and Baixa da Banheira.

References

See also
Setúbal DOC

Former NUTS 3 statistical regions of Portugal
Lisboa Region